This is a full list of Muslim communities in India (OBCs) that are recognised in India's Constitution as Other Backward Class, a term used to classify socially and educationally disadvantaged classes.

Andhra Pradesh and Telangana

Central list 
Below is a list of Muslim communities that have been accorded Other Backward Classes status by the Government of India in the state of Andhra Pradesh and Telangana.

State list 
Below is a list of Muslim communities that have been accorded Other Backward Classes status by the Government of Andhra Pradesh and Telangana and Karnataka state government.

 1. Achchukattalavandlu, Singali, Singamvallu, Achchupanivallu, Achchukattuvaru, Achukatlavandlu.
 2. Attar Saibulu, Attarollu
 3. Dhobi Muslim / Muslim Dhobi / Dhobi Musalman, Turka Chakla or Turka Sakala, Turaka Chakali, Tulukka Vannan, Tsakalas, Sakalas or Chakalas, Muslim Rajakas
 4. Alvi, Alvi, Shah alvi Alvi, Alam, Alvi, Alvi, Darvesh, Shah
 5. Garadi Muslim, Garadi Saibulu, Pamulavallu, Kani-kattuvallu, Garadollu, Garadiga
 6. Gosangi Muslim, Phakeer Sayebulu
 7. Guddi Eluguvallu, Elugu Bantuvallu, Musalman Keelu Gurralavallu
 8. Hajjam, Nai, Nai Muslim, Navid
 9. Labbi, Labbai, Labbon, Labba
 10. Pakeerla, Borewale, Deera Phakirlu, Bonthala
 11. Qureshi / Qassab, Kureshi / Khureshi, Khasab, Marati Khasab, Muslim Katika, Khatik Muslim
 12. Siddi, Yaba, Habshi, Jasi
 13. Turaka Kasha, Kakkukotte Zinka Saibulu, Chakkitakanevale, Terugadu Gontalavaru, Thirugatigantla, Rollaku Kakku Kottevaru, Pattar Phodulu, Chakketakare, Thuraka Kasha
 14. Other Muslim groups, excluding
 Patan, Pathan, Pastoon, Khan
 Mughal, Moghal
 Momin Ansar, Sheikh or Saudagar
 Vip
 Irani
 Bohara, Bohra
 Cutchi-Memon
 Jamayat
 Navayath
 Sayed, Sayyad,Syed

Assam 
 1. Maimal
 2. Pangal
 3. Maimal (Saikh)
 4. Jolha (MOMIN AND ANSARI)
 5. Maria (M-0BC)
 6. DHUNIYA (MUSLIM) {SHAIKH MANSURI}

Bihar

Central list 
Below is a list of Muslim communities that have been accorded Other Backward Classes status by the Government of India in the state of Bihar.

Notes:

1 largely a Hindu caste in Bihar with a small Muslim minority known as Turk Telis

State list 
Below is a list of Muslim communities that have been accorded OBC status by the state government of Bihar:

Dadra and Nagar Haveli 
 Makrani
 Chippi
 Vakta puriya

Delhi

Central list 
Below is a list of Muslim communities that have been accorded Other Backward Classes status by the Government of India in Delhi.

Notes:

State list 
Below is a list of Muslim communities that have been accorded OBC status by the state government of Delhi.

Notes:

1 Only the Darzi community are Muslims.
2 Only Muslim Dhobis are in the OBC list; the Hindu section have Scheduled Caste status.
3 Mansoori is the preferred self-designation for the Dhunia community
4 Alvi is now the preferred self-designation of the Faqir community, but not all Alvis are Faqirs.
5 largely Hindu community with a small Muslim minority
6 largely Hindu community with a small Muslim minority
7 partly Hindu and partly Muslim community
8 the Saifi are Muslim Lohars
9 largely Muslim community with a small Hindu minority
10 largely Muslim community with a small Hindu minority
11 Only Muslim Mochis are in the OBC list; the Hindu section have Scheduled Caste status.
12 largely Hindu community with a small Muslim minority
13 largely Muslim community with a small Hindu minority
14 largely Hindu community with a small Muslim minority

Gujarat

Central list 
Below is a list of Muslim communities that have been accorded Other Backward Classes status in Gujarat.

Notes:

1 The Chunara include a Muslim minority.
2 The Pakhaali are known as Bhishti elsewhere in India.
3 The Lohar are partly Muslim.
4 The Chhipa are largely Muslim.

Haryana

Central list 
Below is a list of Muslim communities that have been accorded Other Backward Classes status by the Government of India in Haryana.

Notes:

1 The Bhat include a Muslim minority.
2 The Dhobi include a small Muslim minority.
3 The Sheikh-Abbasi include a small Muslim minority.
4 The Ghosi are Muslim.
5 The Hajjam or Salmani are Muslim.
6 The Kanjar include a Muslim minority.
7 The Kamboh include a Muslim minority.
8 The Manihar are Muslim.
9 The Saifi are Muslim Lohar.
10 Only Muslim Mochis are in the OBC list; the Hindu section have Scheduled Caste status.
11 The Singiwala are partly Muslim.
12 The Zaragar Muslim Sonar
13 The Haryana Teli are almost entirely Muslim.
14 the Banjara are partly Muslim.
15 Only Muslim Nat are in the OBC list; the Hindu section has Scheduled Caste status.
16 The Gujjar are only partly Muslim.
17 The Nyaria are partly Muslim sections.

Himachal Pradesh 
This is a list of Muslim communities that have been accorded Other Backward Classes status in the state of Himachal Pradesh, India.

Notes:

1 The Hajjam are Muslim Nai.
2 The Ghumar are Punjabi speaking Muslim Kumhar.
3 The Kanjar include a Muslim minority.
4 Most Muslim Gujjar in Himachal Pradesh have Scheduled Tribe status.
5 The julaha are Muslim; most Himachal Pradesh Julaha are Kabirpanth.
6 The Muslim Mallah caste are included in the OBC state list.

Jammu and Kashmir 
This is a list of Muslim communities that have been granted Other Backward Classes status by the Government of India in the state of Jammu and Kashmir, India.

Notes:

1 largely Hindu community with a small Muslim minority
2 largely Hindu community with a small Muslim minority

Kerala 
Mappila Muslims

Madhya Pradesh

Central list 
Below is a list of Muslim communities that have been accorded OBC status by the Government of India in the state of Madhya Pradesh.

 2. Attar
 3. Bagwan
 4. Chhaparband
 5. Dhawad
 6. Darwesi
 7. Fakir Bhandarwala
 8. Gavandi
 9. Gavil Muslim
 10. Khateek
 11. Mansoori
 12. Muslim Madari
 13. Nalba
 14. Naqqash
 15. Nilgar
 16. Pan Faroshs
 17. Putligar
 18. Sanpagarudi
 19. Qassab
 20. Muslim Teli
 21. Muslim Maniyar, Manyar, Bangdiwala, Caste No. 309
 22. Mujawar dafali, Caste No. 339
 23. Tamboli
 24. Muslim Beldar, Caste No. 330
 25. Momin Ansari
 26. Muslim Teli sSamaj

Punjab 
Below is a list of Muslim communities granted OBC status in the Government of India in the state of Punjab.

Notes:

1 largely Hindu community with a small Muslim minority
2 The Ghumiar are Punjabi speaking Muslim Kumhars.
3 largely Hindu community with a small Muslim minority in Malerkotla
4 The Hajjam are Muslim Nais.
5 The Saifis are Muslim Lohar.
6 Only Muslim Mochis are on the OBC list; the Hindu and Sikh section have Scheduled Caste status.
7 largely Hindu community with a small minority of Muslim nomadic Gujjars

Rajasthan

Central list 
This is a list of Muslim communities who have been granted Other Backward Class status by the Government of India in the state of Rajasthan.

Notes:

1 The Barhai and Suthar are largely Hindu communities with a small Muslim minority.
2 The Banjara include a small Muslim Minority.
3 The Bharbhunja include a small Muslim minority.
4 The Chhipa are Muslim.
5 The Bhishti are Muslim, while Mallah include a Muslim minority.
6 The Ghosi and Gaddi are Muslim.
7 The Gujjar are only partly Muslim.
8 Only Muslim Bhangis such as the Hela are in the OBC list; the Hindu sections have Scheduled Caste]status.
9 The Jogi are only partly Muslim.
10 The Kandera are partly Muslim, while the Pinjara are entirely Muslim.
11 The Kumhar are partly Muslim sections.
12 The Manihar are Muslim.
13 The Lohar are partly Muslim.
14 The Bagwan are Muslim Mali, while the Rayeen or Kunjra are entirely Muslim.
15 The Merat and Cheetahs are Muslims.
16 The Nai are partly Muslim.
17 Only Muslim Mochis are in the OBC list; the Hindu section have Scheduled Caste status.
18 Only Muslim Dhobis are in the OBC list; the Hindu section have Scheduled Caste status.

Explanation: In the above list for the State of Rajasthan, all castes, which are known by the name of their respective traditional hereditary occupations and whose members follow different religions, include all members of those castes, irrespective of whether they follow the Hindu religion or Islam or any other religion (Vide Resolution No. 12011/4/2002-BCC dt. 19 June 2003).

State list 
This is a list of Muslim communities accorded OBC status by the state government of Rajasthan, India.

Notes:

1 largely Hindu community with a small Muslim minority
2 The Suthar include a small Muslim minority.
3 The Bharbhunja include a small Muslim minority.
4 The Chhipa are Muslim.
5 The Ghosi are Muslim.
6 The Gujjar are only partly Muslim.
7 Only Muslim Bhangis such as the Hela are in the OBC list; the Hindu sections have Scheduled Caste status.
8 The Kandera are partly Muslim, while the Pinjara are eniterely Muslim.
9 The Muslim Kumhar are now added as Moyla.
10 The Manihar are Muslim.
11 The Faqir are Muslim.
12 The Bagwan are Muslim Mali.
13 The Merat and Cheetahs are Muslims
14 The Nai are partly Muslim
15 Only Muslim Dhobis are in the OBC list; the Hindu section have Scheduled Caste status.
16 Only Muslim Sapera are in the OBC list; the Hindu section have Scheduled Caste status.
17 Only Muslim Nat are in the OBC list; the Hindu section have Scheduled Caste status.
18 includes Muslims
19 Only Muslim Mochis are in the OBC list; the Hindu section have Scheduled Caste status.

Tamil Nadu 
 
 Shaikhs
 Deccanis
 Dudekula
 Labbai, Rowther and Marakayar
 Mapilla
 Pathani

Uttar Pradesh

Central list 
Below is a list of Muslim communities that have been accorded Other Backward Classes status in Uttar Pradesh.

Notes:

1 largely Hindu community with a small Muslim minority
2 The Mallaah include a small Muslim minority.
3 The Kumhar are evenly divided between the Hindu and Muslim sections.
4 The nomadic Van Gujjar are entirely Muslim, while the settled Gujjars of western UP include a large Muslim minority.
5 The Chikwa and Qureshi Qassab are entirely Muslim, while the Chak are Hindu.
6 The Chippe are largely Hindu with a small Muslim minority.
7 largely Hindu with a small Muslim minority
8 the Teli Malik are Muslim.
9 Only Muslim Nat are in the OBC list; the Hindu section have Scheduled Caste status.
10 The Banjara are partly Muslim, while the Mukeri are entirely Muslim.
11 The Barhai are partly Muslim
12 The Bharbhunja are partly Muslim.
13 The Baghban are Muslim Mali.
14 The Manihar are Muslim, while the Churihar are largely Muslim.
15 The Rangrez are Muslim and Rangwa Hindu.
16 The Saifi are Muslim Lohar.
17 The Halwai are partly Muslim.
18 The Hajjam are Muslim Nai.
19 Only Muslim Bhangis such as the Halalkhor and Lalbegi are in the OBC list; the Hindu sections have Scheduled Caste status.
20 Only Muslim Dhobis are in the OBC list, the Hindu section have Scheduled Caste status.
21 Only Muslim Mochis are in the OBC list, the Hindu section have Scheduled Caste status.
22 caste mahigeer faruki ob list

Explanation: In the above list for Uttar Pradesh for all castes linked with traditional hereditary occupations, except those entered with specific mention of name of religion, are included, irrespective of whether their members follow Hinduism, Islam or any other religion.
23 the Mansoori are Muslim Dhunai.

West Bengal

Central list
Below is a list of Muslim communities that have been accorded by OBC status by the Government of India in the state of West Bengal.

State list
Below is a list of Muslim communities that have been accorded OBC status by the state government of West Bengal.

Notes:

1 Indicate Muslim communities amongst the OBCs

See also 
 List of Other Backward Classes
 Scheduled Tribes
 Reservation in India

References 

 
Social groups of India

Muslim Other Backward Classes
Other Backward Classes